is a passenger railway station located in the town of Ina, Saitama, Japan, operated by the Saitama New Urban Transit Company.

Lines 

Station layout
This elevated station consists of one island platform and one side platform serving three tracks, located beneath the Jōetsu Shinkansen, after it branches off the Tohoku Shinkansen line. The side platform is located underneath the island platform.

Platforms

History
The station opened on 22 December 1983.

Passenger statistics
In fiscal 2017, the station was used by an average of 2,854 passengers daily (boarding passengers only).

Surrounding area
Sakae-kita High School
Minami Junior High School

See also
List of railway stations in Japan

References

External links

 Station information 

Railway stations in Saitama Prefecture
Railway stations in Japan opened in 1983
Ina, Saitama